Tanglin Single Member Constituency was a single member constituency (SMC) in the city area of Singapore. The constituency was formed in 1951 and was abolished in 1997.

History 
In 1951, the Tanglin Constituency was formed by carving up Municipal South-West Constituency. In 1955, parts of the constituency were divided to form Cairnhill, Havelock and Queenstown constituencies. In 1959, it was further divided to form River Valley and Ulu Pandan constituencies.

In 1988, it was renamed as Tanglin Single Member Constituency as part of Singapore's political reforms. In 1997, it was abolished and merged into Kreta Ayer–Tanglin Group Representation Constituency.

Member of Parliament

Elections

Elections in the 1990s

Elections in the 1980s

Elections in the 1970s

Elections in the 1960s

Note: Thio Chan Bee, the then incumbent of this ward had contested in the previous general election under Singapore People's Alliance's banner, which had subsequently joined with Singapore Alliance in this GE whereby another party, United Malays National Organisation is one of the alliance member who had stood against him in 1959 GE, Tanglin SMC as well.

Elections in the 1950s

Note: UMNO, MCA and MIC together with Singapore People's Alliance was informally formed as an alliance in 1961, where it still within this term of election  which was the reason for the elections department of Singapore to view Ahmad as a candidate for Singapore Alliance.

Historical maps

References
1984 GE's result
1980 GE's result
1976 GE's result
1972 GE's result
1968 GE's result
1963 GE's result
1959 GE's result
1955 GE's result
1951 GE's result
Brief History on Singapore Alliance

Bedok